The 1996 season was Santos Futebol Clube's eighty-fourth in existence and the club's third-seventh consecutive season in the top flight of Brazilian football.

Players

Squad

Source: Acervo Santista

Statistics

Appearances and goals

Source: Match reports in Competitive matches

Goalscorers

Source: Match reports in Competitive matches

Transfers

In

Out

Friendlies

Competitions

Campeonato Brasileiro

Results summary

First stage

Matches

Copa do Brasil

First round

Campeonato Paulista

First round

Matches

Second round

Matches

Torneiro de Verão

Semi-finals

Finals

Copa dos Campeões Mundiais

First stage

Matches

Supercopa Libertadores

Round of 16

Quarter-finals

Semi-finals

References

Santos FC seasons
Brazilian football clubs 1996 season